Umerkote (Sl. No.: 73) is a Vidhan Sabha constituency of Nabarangpur district, Odisha.

This constituency includes Umerkote, Raighar block and 8 Gram panchayats (Kurushi, Beheda, Kopena, Bakoda, Murtuma, Burja, Sunabeda and Semala) of Umerkote  block.

Elected Members

Fourteen elections were held between 1957 and 2014.
Elected members from the Umerkote constituency are:
2019:(73): Nityanand Gond (BJP)
2014: (73): Subash Gond (BJD)
2009: (73): Jagabandhu Majhi (BJD)
2004: (93): Dharmu Gond (BJP)
2000: (93): Parama Pujari (Congress)
1995: (93): Parama Pujari (Congress)
1990: (93): Gurubari Majhi (Janata Dal)
1985: (93): Parama Pujari (Congress)
1980: (93): Parama Pujari (Congress-I)
1977: (93): Rabisingh Majhi (Janata Party)
1974: (93): Rabisingh Majhi (Utkal Congress)
1971: (87): Rabisingh Majhi (Utkal Congress)
1967: (87): Rabisingh Majhi (Congress)
1961: (1): Sadashiva Tripathy (Congress)
1957: (1): Radhakrushna Biswasray (Congress)

2019 Election Result

2014 Election Result
In 2014 election, Biju Janata Dal candidate Subash Gond defeated Indian National Congress candidate Jatindra Nath Gond by a margin of 10,522 votes.

2009 Election Result
In 2009 election, Biju Janata Dal candidate Jagabandhu Majhi defeated Bharatiya Janata Party candidate Dharmu Gond by a margin of 14,171 votes.

Notes

References 

Assembly constituencies of Odisha
Nabarangpur district